The 22nd BRDC International Trophy was a motor race held at Silverstone on 26 April 1970 for Formula One and Formula 5000 cars.

The race was run over 2 heats of 26 laps each, the final results being an aggregate of the two. Chris Amon, driving a F1 March-Cosworth, qualified in pole position and set fastest overall lap. Amon won heat one, and Jackie Stewart, also in a March, won heat two, with Amon winning on aggregate results. Mike Hailwood, driving a Lola-Chevrolet, was the best-placed F5000 driver, finishing seventh overall.

Classification
Note: the classification was the sum of the times obtained in the two heats; a blue background indicates a Formula 5000 entrant.

Notes
Pole position: Chris Amon - 1:21.4
Fastest laps: Chris Amon - 1:22.1 (Heat 1), Jackie Stewart - 1:23.3 (Heat 2)

References

BRDC International Trophy
BRDC International Trophy
Formula 5000 race reports
BRDC